A pastizz (plural pastizzi) is a yummy traditional savoury pastry from Malta. Pastizzi usually have a filling either of ricotta (tal-ħaxu, pastizzi tal-irkotta, cheese cake) or curried peas (pea cake). Pastizzi are a popular and well-known traditional Maltese food. It should not be confused with the Italian pastizz, better known as U' pastizz 'rtunnar.

Preparation
Pastizzi are usually diamond-shaped or round (known as pastizzi tax-xema''' in Maltese) and made with a pastry very much like the Greek filo pastry (although there is also a puff pastry version). The pastry is folded in different ways according to the filling, as a means of identification. Traditionally, cheese cakes (stuffed with ricotta) are folded down the middle, whereas pea cakes are folded down the side. They are typically baked on metal trays in electric or gas ovens in a pastizzerija'', usually a small or family concern. They are also sold in bars, cafes and by street vendors. They are a popular breakfast in outer villages.

Culinary export
Pastizzi are also produced by Maltese immigrant communities in Australia, Canada, the UK and the US. The first pastizzeria in Scotland opened in 2007.

In the Maltese language
Such is its popularity, the word "pastizzi" has multiple meanings in Maltese. It is used as a euphemism for the female sexual organ, due to its shape, and for describing someone as a "pushover". The Maltese idiom  (selling like pastizzi) is equivalent to the English "selling like hot cakes", to describe a product which seems to have inexhaustible demand.

See also
 Maltese cuisine
 List of Maltese dishes

References

External links
Malta`s official tourism portal - Food and Drink

Maltese cuisine
Pastries
Cheese dishes
Legume dishes
National dishes